Angelo Mario DiGeorge (April 15, 1921 – October 11, 2009) was an Italian American physician and pediatric endocrinologist from Philadelphia who pioneered the research on the autosomal dominant immunodeficiency now commonly referred to as DiGeorge syndrome.

Early life and education 
DiGeorge was the son of two Italian immigrants, Antonio DiGiorgio and his wife Emilia (née Taraborelli). He was born in South Philadelphia on April 15, 1921. His teacher at primary school changed his Italian surname DiGiorgio into the "American" DiGeorge. He graduated at the top of his class from South Philadelphia High School for Boys in 1939 and was awarded the White Williams Scholarship at the Temple University, where he graduated with distinction in chemistry in 1943. DiGeorge received his medical degree with honors from Temple University School of Medicine in 1946, and completed his internship at Temple University Hospital. He then left Philadelphia from 1947 to 1949 to serve as captain and Chief of the Medical Service for the U.S. Army 124th Station Hospital in Linz, Austria. After returning to Philadelphia, Angelo met his future wife, Natalie Picarello, who was a registered nurse at Temple Hospital. He completed his pediatric residency at St. Christopher's Hospital for Children and did a postdoctoral fellowship in endocrinology at the Jefferson Medical College in 1954.

Academic career 
DiGeorge joined the Department of Pediatrics of Temple University School of Medicine in 1952. In 1967, he became a professor of pediatrics and an Emeritus Professor in 1991. Concurrently, he was also an attending physician at St. Christopher's, where he became the Chief of Endocrinology and Metabolism (1961–1989), and the Director of the Pediatric Clinical Research Center (1965–1982). He served on the Pediatric Endocrinology Subboard of the American Board of Pediatrics from 1987 until 1992. He was a founding member and past president (1983–1984) of the Lawson-Wilkins Pediatric Endocrine Society and was the author of the endocrinology chapter for the Nelson Textbook of Pediatrics, known by pediatricians around the world as the "Green Bible" for more than 40 years.

DiGeorge first gained international recognition in the mid-1960s for his ground breaking discovery of a disorder characterized by congenital absence of the thymus and associated abnormalities. This birth defect is now referred to as DiGeorge syndrome; alternate names include Velocardiofacial syndrome, Shprintzen Syndrome, and chromosome 22q11.2 deletion syndrome (the majority of affected individuals lack a distinct part of the long arm of chromosome 22). DiGeorge syndrome includes a pattern of more than 200 different defects, including hypoplastic thymus and parathyroid glands, conotruncal heart defects, and a characteristic facial appearance. Velocardiofacial syndrome is marked by the association of congenital conotruncal heart defects, cleft palate or velar insufficiency, facial anomalies, and learning difficulties. It is now accepted that these two syndromes represent the different expression of a unique disorder manifesting at different stages of life. DiGeorge Syndrome is one of the most common genetic disorders known, occurring in about one every 4,000 livebirths. DiGeorge's original 1965 report and the initial paper reporting on this anomaly have been widely quoted and continues to garner citations.

On a personal level, he was described as a compassionate physician who viewed the patient as a whole person, a superb diagnostician, a keen observer, a great teacher, a masterful lecturer, an absorbing storyteller, an avid reader, a literary writer, and above all, a kind-hearted, fair-minded person. In addition to medicine, he had many other hobbies, including gardening, all of the performing arts, politics, stamp collecting, and Philadelphia sports, especially the Philadelphia Phillies. DiGeorge loved all things "Philly" and all things Italian. He first learned the art of debate on the debate team at South Philadelphia High School for Boys and he gladly engaged in animated debates on virtually any topic from sports to politics with his professional colleagues and at the family dinner table throughout his life. Dr Angelo DiGeorge was often invited to Italian scientific meetings, including the San Giovanni Rotondo Medical Genetic School and the Rome "Deletion 22q11" Meeting in 2002. It was there in Rome that Angelo DiGeorge and Bob Shprintzen, the fathers of the unique disorder, met for the first time, although they had long been working on the same syndrome, living close to one another in the United States.

Death
DiGeorge died at the age of 88 years, on October 11, 2009, of kidney failure at his home in East Falls, Philadelphia.

References

1921 births
2009 deaths
South Philadelphia High School alumni
Temple University School of Medicine alumni
American pediatric endocrinologists
Physicians from Philadelphia
American people of Italian descent
Deaths from kidney failure
United States Army Medical Corps officers
American expatriates in Austria